Léonce Cohen (12 February 1829 – 26 February 1901) was a 19th-century French composer.

Biography
Cohen was born in Paris from an Alsatian merchant family. His mother, Merline Weil (1805–1875), was the sister of the writer Godcheaux Weil, known as Ben-Levy, a cousin of Adolphe Crémieux, and the great-aunt of Henri Bergson and Marcel Proust.

Aged thirteen, Cohen began his training at the Conservatoire de Paris where he specialised in the violin. Additionally, he also followed the organ class of François Benoist and studied musical composition with Aimé Leborne. He won the Prix de Rome in 1852 with the cantata Le Retour du Virginie (libretto after Bailly du Rollet), beating out Camille Saint-Saëns that year.

During his studies, Cohen was violinist at the Comédie Italienne in Paris. After his stay in Rome he wrote a solemn mass, applauded by Fromental Halévy. On his return to Paris in 1855, he joined the Comédie Italienne but also the Théâtre du Vaudeville as violinist. From 1875, he worked as violist in the Orchestre de la Société des Concerts du Conservatoire.

In 1858, his operetta Mam'zelle Jeanne was created at the Théâtre des Bouffes-Parisiens, followed in 1866 by Bettina. In 1862, he published his École du musicien, ou solfège théorique et pratique, avec accompagnement de piano, which he dedicated to Ambroise Thomas.

He died in Paris.

External links
 
 File of léonce Cohen on Geni.com

1829 births
1901 deaths
19th-century classical composers
19th-century French composers
Conservatoire de Paris alumni
19th-century French Jews
French operetta composers
French Romantic composers
Musicians from Paris
Prix de Rome for composition
Pupils of François Benoist